Reaxion Corp was a Seattle-based mobile game publishing company. While its primary business is developing and publishing games for mobile phones, Reaxion has also produced several other types of mobile applications, including a mobile Content Management System. Reaxion produces a number of well-known mobile games in a variety of genres, including puzzle, fighting, sports, and strategy. Games from Reaxion include Men in Black, Kojak, Shop 'Til You Drop and Frame Games. Reaxion also manages a mobile gaming community called Gamarama, which allows users to compete in several mobile games using their phones. Reaxion has relationships with all major North American wireless service carriers, such as Sprint, Verizon, and Cingular, as well as several other North American and some major European and Asian carriers

In addition to publishing mobile games, Reaxion also has an in-house development department that does most of its software development work for both the BREW and Java ME platforms. Reaxion's development team also manages the quality assurance process. In addition, Reaxion does all of its own marketing and advertising.

History
Reaxion was founded in 2001 as a mobile game development and publishing company.  The company is headquartered in Seattle, WA (Executive, Sales & Finance) and has a test and QA office in San Diego.  In addition, the company maintains wholly owned subsidiary offices in Moscow (Development, Creative, Product Marketing, & Russia & Direct Sales) and Minsk (Development).  In 2002, the company released the first commercially available BREW extension, an XML parser. Then, in 2003, it released the first commercially available MMS client on BREW. In 2004, Reaxion acquired the Java ME developer 3SYM. More recently, Reaxion closed a $2M Series A investment from i-Hatch Venture Partners in August 2005.

Games Developed and/or Published by Reaxion: 
Following is a partial list of the games that Reaxion has published. 
List Updated: December 7, 2006
Detective Puzzles
Men in Black: Alien Assault
Fightality
Sexy Mahjong
Incadia
Frame Games
The Longest Yard
Shop 'til You Drop
Pro Curling
Mahjong Deluxe
Minigolf 2
Yetisports
Hero's Quest
Hive of Evil

Reaxion was closed in June 2010.

References

External links
 www.reaxion.com
 www.gamarama.com

Mobile game companies
Video game companies of the United States
Companies established in 2001